Trichromia metaphoenica is a moth of the family Erebidae. It was described by James John Joicey and George Talbot in 1917. It is found in French Guiana.

References

 

metaphoenica
Moths described in 1917